Hurricane Dean was the strongest tropical cyclone of the 2007 Atlantic hurricane season. It was the most intense North Atlantic hurricane since Hurricane Wilma of 2005, tying for eighth overall. Additionally, it made the fourth most intense Atlantic hurricane landfall. A Cape Verde hurricane that formed on August 13, 2007, Dean took a west-northwest path from the eastern Atlantic Ocean through the Saint Lucia Channel and into the Caribbean. It strengthened into a major hurricane, reaching Category 5 status on the Saffir–Simpson hurricane wind scale before passing just south of Jamaica on August 20. The storm made landfall on the Yucatán Peninsula on August 21 at peak intensity. It crossed the peninsula and emerged into the Bay of Campeche weakened, but still remained a hurricane. It strengthened briefly before making a second landfall near Tecolutla in the Mexican state of Veracruz on August 22. Dean drifted to the northwest, weakening into a remnant low which dissipated uneventfully over the southwestern United States. Dean was the second-most intense tropical cyclone worldwide of 2007 in terms of pressure, only behind Cyclone George in the Australian region, and tied with Felix as the most intense worldwide in terms of 1-minute sustained winds.

The hurricane's intense winds, waves, rains and storm surge were responsible for at least 45 deaths across ten countries and caused estimated damages of US$1.66 billion. First impacting the islands of the Lesser Antilles, Dean's path through the Caribbean devastated agricultural crops, particularly those of Martinique and Jamaica. Upon reaching Mexico, Hurricane Dean was a Category 5 storm, but it missed major population centers and its exceptional Category 5 strength landfall caused no deaths and less damage than in the Caribbean islands it passed as a Category 2 storm.

Through the affected regions, clean up and repair took months to complete. Donations solicited by international aid organizations joined national funds in clearing roads, rebuilding houses, and replanting destroyed crops. In Jamaica, where the damage was worst, banana production did not return to pre-storm levels for over a year. Mexico's tourist industry, too, took almost a year to rebuild its damaged cruise ship infrastructure.

Dean was the first hurricane to make landfall in the Atlantic basin at Category 5 intensity since Hurricane Andrew on August 24, 1992. Dean's Category 5 landfall was in a sparsely populated area and thus far less damaging than Andrew's, even though Dean was much larger, but its long swath of damage resulted in its name retirement from the World Meteorological Organization's Atlantic hurricane naming lists.

Meteorological history

On August 11, 2007, a tropical wave moved off the west coast of Africa, and, encountering favorable conditions, quickly developed into Tropical Depression Four, about 520 miles (835 km) west-southwest of Cape Verde on August 13. The depression moved briskly westward, and was upgraded to Tropical Storm Dean at 1500 UTC on August 14. The storm's intensity continued to build although dry air and cooler air inflow from the north were slowing structural development. Ragged bands formed on August 15 and the formation of a partial eyewall was observed later that day.

Intensification continued, and the storm was upgraded to Hurricane Dean at 5 am EDT (0900 UTC) August 16. The deep-layered ridge to the north continued to steer the system west, towards the Caribbean Sea. The storm quickly strengthened to a Category 2 hurricane on the Saffir–Simpson Hurricane Scale. The storm's development slowed slightly but a reconnaissance aircraft discovered a closed eyewall on August 17 as the storm passed through the Lesser Antilles. Data from the aircraft indicated that Hurricane Dean had strengthened to a Category 3 hurricane and its trailing bands were still over the Lesser Antilles. During the evening of August 17, Dean strengthened into a Category 4 hurricane and continued to steadily grow in both size and intensity through the night. On August 18 the presence of a double eyewall was noted, indicating an eyewall replacement cycle and causing short term fluctuations in intensity. These fluctuations did not affect the storm's well defined satellite presentation. Operationally, Dean was thought to have only been a Category 4 on the 18th, but post-storm analysis shows that Dean had become a 165 miles per hour (265 km/h) Category 5 on that day. Dean weakened very slightly on the morning of August 19 as it finished the eyewall replacement cycle and began to interact with the island of Jamaica.

Hurricane Dean passed south of Jamaica on the evening of August 19 and began to intensify again that night. Its eyewall replacement cycle was thought to be completed. A concentric eyewall was briefly observed again on the morning of August 20, but did not last long. The hurricane, still tracking west-northwest under the influence of a strengthening deep-layered high-pressure system to the north, moved over waters with extremely high heat content and began to strengthen once again. The eyewall became even better defined during the day, and, at 8:35 pm AST on August 20 (0035 August 21, UTC), Dean restrengthened to a Category 5 hurricane, the highest rating on the Saffir–Simpson Hurricane Scale. It made landfall as a Category 5 storm in Quintana Roo's Costa Maya region, 40 mi (65 km) northeast of the border between Mexico and Belize, and weakened on its way over land, reemerging on the western side of Yucatán as a Category 1 storm. Dean regained strength as it crossed the Gulf of Mexico, and made its second landfall as a Category 2 storm on August 22, at around 11:30 CDT, near Tecolutla, Veracruz, to the south of Tuxpan, where after it moved westward, losing strength and disintegrating over central Mexico. A small remnant circulation reached the Pacific Ocean, eventually moving northwestward around an anticyclone, roughly parallel to the Mexican coast and finally back inland over the southwestern United States, where it completely dissipated on August 27.

Preparations
Hurricane Dean's smooth and well-predicted track gave unusually advance warning to all of the nations in its path and allowed them time to prepare for the storm's impact.

Lesser Antilles

As Hurricane Dean approached the Lesser Antilles the local meteorological services issued watches and warnings, advising residents to prepare for the storm. Hurricane warnings were issued for St. Lucia, Dominica,  Martinique and Guadeloupe and its dependencies. Hurricane watches were issued for Saba and St. Eustatius. Tropical storm warnings were issued for Barbados, Antigua, Barbuda, St. Kitts, Nevis, and St. Maarten St. Vincent and the Grenadines, the U.S. Virgin Islands, and the British Virgin Islands. Tropical storm watches were issued for Sint Maarten, St. Vincent, Grenada and its dependencies, Montserrat, and Anguilla.

Local authorities closed airports, set up shelters, and readied emergency service personnel. Authorities in Martinique canceled a memorial to the victims of West Caribbean Airways Flight 708 and began to set up shelters. In Dominica, tourists were evacuated to concrete shelters and the vast majority of foreign medical students from the Ross University School of Medicine evacuated the island. The government of Dominica also canceled leave for emergency service personnel and evacuated Princess Margret Hospital, fearing that its roof might be vulnerable to the storm's winds. Martinique's main airport and both of St. Lucia's commercial airports closed when the last airplanes landed on the night of August 16 and the storm's outer rainbands began to sweep over the island.

In anticipation of Dean's significant damage, several emergency response groups gathered funds and readied personnel. On August 14 the Caribbean Disaster Emergency Response Agency (CDERA) placed its Regional Response Mechanism on standby and contacted the National Disaster Coordinators of all member states in the Lesser Antilles. On August 15 the U.S. Agency for International Development (USAID) dispatched teams to Barbados, Dominica, and St. Kitts in advance of the hurricane to provide damage assessment should the hurricane affect those islands. The Eastern Caribbean Donor Group convened a meeting on August 16 under the Chair of the Resident Representative United Nations Development Programme Barbados in anticipation that member states would require international assistance.

Greater Antilles

Hurricane warnings were issued for all of Jamaica, for Haiti from Port-au-Prince to the Dominican border, and for the Dominican Republic from Barahona to the Haitian border. Tropical Storm warnings were issued for the rest of Hispaniola and for coastal Cuba between Camagüey and Guantánamo. Hundreds of thousands were evacuated from vulnerable low-lying and coastal areas and disaster management programs were activated throughout the Greater Antilles.

Jamaica, which was forecast to bear the brunt of Hurricane Dean, underwent the most extensive preparations. The Jamaican government executed long-standing evacuation plans, including converting the country's national arena into a shelter and relocating inmates from two maximum security prisons. Political parties in the island suspended their campaigning for the August 27 national elections, to allow residents to prepare for the storm. Curfews were put in place for parts of the island, while off-duty essential personnel were called back to work. More than 1,000 schools and churches were converted to emergency shelters, but residents only occupied 47 of them before the storm's arrival. Evidently the country's high crime rate led islanders to fear for their belongings should they abandon their homes. UNICEF prepared 4 emergency health kits and 1,000 water containers and Copa Airlines agreed to fly the supplies to Jamaica on its scheduled August 22 flight, if possible. The World Food Program prepared food stocks in nearby Haiti, ready to move them to Jamaica if they were needed. The United Nations Disaster Assessment and Coordination (UNDAC) team tried to reach Jamaica, but only one member arrived before all incoming flights were canceled. The United States confirmed that it would offer aid if it was needed, and the North-West Caribbean Donor Group met to decide what actions would need to be taken.

The island of Hispaniola was also predicted to be heavily affected by the storm. Workers from World Vision supplied food, clean water, medicines and emergency generators in the southern provinces of the Dominican Republic, and in the southern departments of Haiti where hurricane warnings had been issued. In low-lying areas, 1,580 residents of the Dominican Republic and more than 1,000 Haitians were evacuated as the storm approached. Small craft were advised to stay in port, while Haiti's Toussaint Louverture International Airport was closed.

The Cayman Islands were expected to suffer badly if Hurricane Dean passed too close, and mandatory evacuations were instigated for the low-lying Little Cayman. Tourists were forbidden from entering the island and extra flights were added to evacuate those that were already there. Schools and civic centers were converted to shelters on Grand Cayman and Cayman Brac, and, despite the mandatory evacuation, one shelter was opened on Little Cayman for the residents who remained there. Expecting catastrophic damage, two Royal Navy ships of the Atlantic Patrol Task (North),  and RFA Wave Ruler, followed 150 mi (240 km) behind the storm in order to arrive at Cayman as soon after the hurricane as possible.

Cuba and Puerto Rico, neither of which were expected to experience the worst of Dean's strength, prepared more modestly. Cuba's Civil Defense evacuated 350,000 people from the coastal provinces. The government in Havana suspended all tourist programs ahead of the storm. Soldiers and emergency officials were prepared to convert schools and other government buildings into temporary shelters, but stood down when it became evident that they would not needed. The U.S. Federal Emergency Management Agency (FEMA) deployed a five-member team to Puerto Rico ahead of Hurricane Dean. They were equipped with satellite communication systems to provide video-teleconferencing and help make real-time assessments of any damage.

Mexico

With Hurricane Dean's path predicted well in advance of the storm, the Government of Mexico was able to make ample preparations. On August 17, a state of emergency was declared for the state of Quintana Roo where Dean was expected to make landfall. On August 18 authorities began evacuating tourists and those residents living in the most vulnerable parts of Quintana Roo. The state government set up storm shelters in schools and other public buildings. With emergency supplies at the ready, the state of Yucatán, Quintana Roo's neighbour to the northwest, declared a green alert. On August 19 a hurricane watch was issued on the Yucatán Peninsula from Chetumal to San Felipe and residents made their last-minute preparations.

Belize
A hurricane warning was issued for the coastal locations north of Belize City with the forecast of 150 mph (240 km/h) winds. The government instituted a dusk-to-dawn curfew from Belize City to the Mexican border. On August 16 and 17, Prime Minister Said Musa chaired two meetings of Belize's National Emergency Management Organization (NEMO). He instructed the newly created Coastguard to evacuate popular tourist sites Caye Caulker and Ambergris Caye by boat and plane. Authorities also evacuated Belize City's three hospitals, moving high-risk patients inland to the capital Belmopan. The mayor urged residents to leave Belize City and to make use of shelters in the capital.

The United Nations Disaster Assessment and Coordination team dispatched two members to Belize City and the rest of the team traveled to Belmopan. Government supplies were stored in Orange Walk, Corozal ready for post-storm relief. Essential equipment from the Red Cross and the Pan American Health Organization was stored in the elevated UNICEF building and the Belize City UN building was converted to a crisis center.

Gulf of Mexico

Oil futures spiked on August 15 as analysts considered the impact of Hurricane Dean on refining capacity if it were to move into the Caribbean as predicted. Transocean evacuated 11 nonessential workers late on August 15 from an oil rig located about 160 mi (260 km) southeast of New Orleans. The company left about 125 personnel on board the structure. A day later Royal Dutch Shell evacuated 275 ancillary staff, following an evacuation of 188 due to Tropical Storm Erin.

On August 18, 2007,  of oil and 11 million cubic feet (310,000 m³) of natural gas were shut-in per day, accounting for 0.8% of crude production in the Gulf of Mexico. By 11:30 am CST (1630 UTC), two rigs and one platform evacuated personnel.

Pemex, the state-owned Mexican oil company, made preparations to shut down oil production on August 19 ahead of Dean. It evacuated 13,360 workers from more than 140 oil platforms, using 55 boats and 29 helicopters. As the storm continued to intensify, the number of evacuated Pemex workers increased to 18,000 on August 20, and all 407 wells and drilling operations were abandoned.

Other regions
Throughout the Caribbean Sea, about a dozen cruise ships altered their routes to avoid Hurricane Dean. Honduras was put on a state of preventative alert for 48 hours, particularly the departments to the north of the country; the Bay Islands were on a state of red alert. There were places ready to accommodate 10,000 people for 15 days if necessary.

In the United States, the Louisiana Governor's Office of Homeland Security and Emergency Preparedness activated its Crisis Action Team on August 16 to monitor the storm and coordinate preparation. Governor of Louisiana Kathleen Blanco declared a state of emergency early on the evening of August 17, asking for a presidential emergency declaration to give Louisiana access to federal funds prior to any landfall. Texas Governor Rick Perry declared Dean to be an imminent threat to the state, and initiated a full-scale hurricane preparedness effort on August 17 when the storm was at least five days away. Prior to the storm, Texas suffered severe flooding from several June–July storms, and Tropical Storm Erin left the ground still saturated. Governor Perry feared that more rainfall from Dean would cause additional flash flooding, and had 250 Texas Parks and Wildlife Department crews on standby with boats to assist in potential evacuations. He was willing to deploy up to 10,000 Texas Military Forces soldiers, and did deploy several elements of the Texas State Guard who set up emergency shelters. The Texas fuel industry began surging fuel loads to coastal counties to ensure adequate fuel in the event of the hurricane causing a disruption to the fuel distribution system. In anticipation of evacuations, the Texas Department of Transportation began working on extra evacuation lanes and contraflow. NASA cut short the STS-118 mission as a precaution, in case Dean approached Mission Control at the Lyndon B. Johnson Space Center in Houston. To that effect, mission managers cut the mission's final spacewalk short by two hours, allowing them to land a day earlier than originally planned.

Impact

Lesser Antilles

Hurricane Dean entered the Caribbean as a Category 2 hurricane through the Saint Lucia Channel on August 17. It moved briskly between the Lesser Antillean islands of St. Lucia and Martinique, with its storm surge and rain bands reaching every island in the chain. Damage was most severe in Martinique where total damage was estimated at €350 million and three indirect deaths, while nearby Guadeloupe suffered €150 million of damage. In St. Lucia, damage was mostly caused by the high seas and was estimated at US$18 million.

Martinique experienced 75 mph (120 km/h) winds with gusts to 105 mph (170 km/h). The torrential rainfall, which reached 332 mm (13.07 in) caused flooding throughout the island, with the town of Rivière-Pilote flooding completely. The majority of Martinique's population were left without electricity, water, telephone, or food, and 600 Martiniquans were left homeless. The storm destroyed Martinique's entire banana crop, and 70% of the island's sugar cane plantations. The damage to these two agricultural sectors accounted for the majority of the island's €400 million damage.

On the evening of August 16, 12 hours before the storm arrived in St. Lucia, power outages began in some of the island's neighborhoods. The night saw heavy rains, 1.58 in (40 mm) at St. Lucia's Hewanorra International Airport, and intense thunderstorms and by morning hurricane-force winds peaked at 90 mph (145 km/h). The winds uprooted trees, downed electricity poles, disabled bridges, triggered landslides, and damaged several roofs. Saint Lucia's capital, Castries, was flooded by the storm surge which left boulders and fishing boats on the streets. One person drowned in Sarrot after being swept away by a rain-swollen river while trying to recover a cow. Hurricane Dean damaged the roofs of two of the island's hospitals, but no-one was injured. Several other buildings were damaged, mostly on the island's northern coast which was most exposed to the hurricane. The Ministry of Education reported that 11 schools had sustained a combined total of EC$300,000 of damage, and nationwide damage to housing and buildings totaled EC$800,000. The Ministry of Communications, Works, Transport, and Public Utilities reported that most of the country's major infrastructure remained functional, and no long-term disruptions occurred.

The hardest hit area of Saint Lucia was its agricultural sector.  of banana farms in Mabouya Valley, Roseau Valley, and Marc Marc were severely damaged with many of the plantations waterlogged or outright destroyed. An average of 75% of the crops were lost, with fields in the Northern Farms losing up to 80% and in the Roseau Valley losing up to 85%. The cost to the agriculture industry was $13.2 million, bringing Hurricane Dean's total cost on the island to $17.3 million (US$6.4 million in 2007) or 0.5% of the nation's GDP.

Greater Antilles

The storm passed to the south of most of the Greater Antilles, though its outer rain bands crossed many of the islands, and delivered hurricane-force winds to Jamaica. Puerto Rico, Cuba, and the Cayman Islands were mostly spared, though Hurricane Dean passed 50 to 60 mi (80 to 95 km) south of Jamaica as a Category 4 hurricane. In Jamaica the rain caused flooding on the eastern side of the island and landslides in the northeast. At least two direct deaths were confirmed. Over 1,500 roofs were lost, primarily to the hurricane-force winds, and 1,582 of the 3,127 damaged homes were uninhabitable. Landslides and fallen trees blocked hundreds of roads, particularly in the rural northeast region. As in the Lesser Antilles, Jamaica suffered severe damage to its agricultural sector. Forty percent of the sugarcane crop, 80-to-100% of the banana crop, 75% of the coffee trees under three years old, and 20% of the top layer of the cocoa crop were lost. Hurricane Dean affected 248 roads, including 186 that were blocked: 10 were blocked in the Kingston metropolitan region, 14 sections were blocked in St. Andrew, 43 roads were blocked in St. Catherine, eight roads were blocked in the Western Region (Saint James, Hanover, Westmoreland, and Trelawny), and 110 roads were blocked in the Northeast region.

Haiti and the Dominican Republic, which share the island of Hispaniola, were spared much of the hurricane's force, as it passed 170 mi (270 km) south of them. However, 15 people were killed among the island's two nations. Heavy rain flooded the streets of Santo Domingo and rough surf pounded the coast. Rain also caused landslides in Haiti, destroying several hundred homes and forcing 5,154 people into temporary shelters, and compromising the temperamental water system in the town of Bainet.

Cuba, Puerto Rico, and the Cayman Islands experienced high surf and heavy rains, though despite a power outage in Grand Cayman, no significant damage was reported. There, 2000 people weathered the storm in temporary shelters. The hurricane's outer bands swept over Cuba between August 19 and August 21, bringing heavy rain and high seas, yet sparing the island damaging winds. Rain from Hurricane Dean flooded several roads throughout Puerto Rico, and there was heavy surf along the island's coast, but no deaths or injuries were reported.

Mexico

The hurricane strengthened right up until it made landfall near Majahual on the Quintana Roo coast of the Yucatán Peninsula on August 21, 2007, as a Category 5 hurricane. Wind gusts of 200 mph (320 km/h) were reported. The state's tourist cities of Cancún and Cozumel were spared the worst of the storm, but it wreaked havoc in the state capital Chetumal, 40 mi (65 km) south of landfall, causing significant flooding.  The town of Majahual, which had a population of 200, was totally destroyed by the storm. Storm surge and high winds severely damaged or destroyed hundreds of buildings and had the strength to crumple steel girders. The waves tore away portions of the concrete docks at Costa Maya's popular cruise port and the harbor was closed to cruise ships for almost a year. Despite the storm's tremendous intensity, not a single death was attributed to its initial landfall, owing mostly to the government's thorough preparations and forecasters' ample warning.

Following the second landfall on the Veracruz coast, two rivers in the mountains of the state of Hidalgo overflowed, and rain fell as far west as the Pacific coast. Veracruz Governor Fidel Herrera said there was "a tremendous amount of damage". Petroleum production was not severely damaged 

Rainfall amounts of 4 to 8 in (100 to 200 mm) fell across the states of Jalisco and Nayarit. This rainfall caused one fatality in Jalisco after a mudslide fell on 10 houses, killing one of the occupants. Five people were killed in Puebla by landslides, and one more was crushed after a wall on his house collapsed. One person in Veracruz was electrocuted after touching a power line while doing roof repairs. In Michoacán, a man was struck by lightning under a tree in the outer bands of the storm, and two people died in Hidalgo when the roof collapsed in their house. Hurricane Dean killed 12 people in Mexico but remarkably no one was killed by its first (and catastrophically powerful) landfall on the Yucatán Peninsula. Between the two landfalls damages, focused mainly in the agricultural sector, totaled Mex$2.05 billion (US$160 million).

Belize
The town of Corozal on Belize's northern border experienced the worst conditions in the country. Trees were downed throughout the town, and minor flooding was reported. Eight thousand were displaced to shelters, though all returned home in less than two days. Throughout the entire country, the Belizean Ministry of Health reported no storm-related fatalities and only a few minor injuries.

Belize's agricultural sector received significant damage. Its sugar cane fields and papaya crops suffered extensive damage. The Belizean Government's National Emergency Management Organization estimated Dean's damage to the papaya industry at BZ$30 million and to the sugar industry at  worth BZ$3.6 million. Belize Sugar Industries Ltd. reported that the country's sugar crop that year was the worst on record, producing 980,000 lb (445,000 kg) of sub-standard cane, compared to 1.2 million lb (545,000 kg) of high quality cane the year before. More than 1000 people were out of work as a result of the damage to the papaya and sugar cane plantations. The government attempted to improve the next crop season in 2008 by providing fertilizers to the farmers whose land had been damaged by Dean the year before. Prime Minister Said Musa estimated that it would cost US$10 million to replace or repair all the damaged houses in Belize.

Other regions
No land effects were reported in Nicaragua but a four-year-old girl drowned on a boat that sank amidst high winds and waves at the mouth of the Kukra River.

While the hurricane itself never approached the United States, heavy surf and rip currents were reported on the beaches of Florida. One person drowned and at least 35 people had to be rescued from the turbulent waters at Siesta Key caused by Hurricane Dean. Rough seas produced by Dean caused minor flooding in Dauphin Island, Alabama. Damages from the flooding amounted to $100,000. The remnant circulation of Dean, after lingering off the Pacific Coast, moved inland by Santa Barbara, California, and brought heavy thunderstorms and localized flooding to coastal Southern California on the morning of August 26. The remnants crossed the Mojave Desert on the morning of August 27. Las Vegas, received a daily record of 0.58 in (15 mm) of rain, with flash flooding and minor damage.

Aftermath

Despite Dean's significant damage, it did not have severe effects on infrastructure, and the non-agricultural sectors of most affected nations recovered quickly. Most cruise lines diverted their ships away from the Western Caribbean in anticipation of Hurricane Dean's passage, though by August 27 all were back on schedule, except those with damaged ports in Belize and the Yucatán. The Lesser Antilles and the Greater Antilles were especially quick to resume servicing cruise lines, as their ports opened within days.

Lesser Antilles

Although Hurricane Dean was only a Category 2 hurricane when its northern eyewall passed over Martinique, the wind and widespread flooding destroyed 70% of the island's sugar cane crop and all of its banana crop, valued at €400 million  or 10% of GDP. Remarkably the tourism industry withstood the storm well; only a few hotels reported minor damage and the airport opened the day after the hurricane. Other than landscaping damage, all of the island's hotels were fully functional by the end of August.

The French Overseas Minister, Christian Estrozy and French Prime Minister, François Fillon visited French Caribbean island to assess the storm's damage. They estimated the storm left 600 people homeless. The brevity of their visit prompted some of Martinique's famous writers, including Edouard Glissant, Patrick Chamoiseau and Raphael Confiant, to write an open letter airing their grievances concerning French politics and the handling of Hurricane Dean's impact.

François Fillon then visited Guadeloupe and brought with him a team of experts from the Ministry of the Interior to assess the nature and cost of the damage. The local government reported to them that 75% of Guadeloupe's banana plantations, valued at €100 million, were totally destroyed. Despite promises by Overseas Minister Christian Estrosi that all problems would be resolved within three months, it took over six months to restart banana production, and several more to restore lost capacity. Other than the crop damage, the island suffered only minor wind and flooding damage, both of which were quickly repaired.

Jamaica

On August 24, Jamaican Prime Minister Portia Simpson-Miller announced that her government would provide JA$225 million (US$3.2 million) in emergency assistance to the country's agriculture sector. This aid was targeted at the country's hardest-hit parishes. She also announced a JA$500 million (US$7.1 million) programme to provide grants and low-interest loans for emergency housing repairs. Temporary tarpaulins were also provided to patch roofs at no cost.

The World Food Program immediately placed 5,500 Jamaicans on complementary food assistance, a daily ration of 1900 kJ (450 kcal) of High Energy Biscuits, for two weeks. Within three days US$398,000 of pre-prepared United States Agency for International Development (USAID) emergency supplies arrived on the island. The airlift was composed mostly of mattresses, blankets, plastic sheeting, hygiene kits and water containers. The Inter-American Development Bank (IDB) provided a US$200,000 grant to support the relief effort and the Chinese Red Cross, despite dealing with Typhoon Sepat, sent US$30,000 to its Jamaican counterpart for the purchase of emergency relief supplies.

In December, four months after the hurricane struck the island, the World Bank's board of directors approved a US$10 million emergency loan. World Bank Director for the Caribbean and the Jamaican Finance Minister negotiated a 17-year repayment plan, and endowed the money into the Jamaica Hurricane Dean Emergency Recovery Project. The Jamaica Social Investment Fund, which was charged with implementing the project, used the money to "rebuild and support schools, health centers, and community and farm roads affected by the hurricane". The Hurricane Dean Emergency Recovery Project finally kicked off in June 2008, with the issuance of rural road repair contracts valued at JA$37 million (US$520,000).

By the end of the summer on 2008, banana production in Jamaica was returning to pre-Dean levels. With the help of JA$1.1 billion (US$15.5 million) of aid from the EU's Banana Support Programme, thousands of acres were replanted. Banana chips were the first products ready for export at the beginning of the summer, with fresh banana production following shortly thereafter.

Mexico

Although Dean's landfall in Mexico occurred in a relatively uninhabited area and the storm's well-predicted track gave ample warning, the storm inflicted extreme damage. In Majahual, the only town to experience the full force of the hurricane, hundreds of buildings were destroyed. Quintana Roo Governor Félix González Canto reported that although the cleanup in the state capital of Chetumal was completed within three weeks, it took more than six months to fix all of the region's more rural roads. Unable to handle the hurricane's aftermath, the state government appealed to federal authorities for aid. Together, they established a housing-repair fund which contributed to the reconstruction of over 37,000 residences.

The cruise port of Puerto Costa Maya was severely damaged, causing Carnival Cruise Lines and Royal Caribbean Cruises, the world's two largest cruise operators, to divert away from the port until at least 2009. The Mexican government was quick to fund rebuilding of the destroyed concrete piers which, by June 2008, were rebuilt to accommodate even larger ships than before.

The federal government was initially lauded for its swift and thorough preparation to which most observers, including the United Nations, attributed Dean's low death toll. However, after the storm there were several accusations of political motivation in the distribution of aid. Members of President Felipe Calderón's Partido Accion Nacional (PAN) distributed bags of bread, funded by the nation's disaster relief coffers, carrying the party's logo. In Veracruz, Governor Fidel Herrera was accused by both the PAN and his own Partido Revolucionario Institucional (PRI) of using state resources, including hurricane relief, to support the campaigns of PRI candidates.

Retirement

As the first Category 5 landfalling hurricane in 15 years, and due to its widespread impact, the name Dean was officially retired on May 13, 2008 by the World Meteorological Organization during its annual meeting in Orlando, Florida, and will never be used again for an Atlantic tropical cyclone. It was replaced by Dorian on List V of the Atlantic hurricane naming lists, which was itself retired after the 2019 season and replaced by Dexter.

In literature

Hurricane Dean featured prominently in the travel novel Chasing Dean by Welsh surf/travel writer Tom Anderson. The book is an account of surfing America's hurricane states and the swell produced by Hurricane Dean.

See also

 List of Category 5 Atlantic hurricanes
 Hurricane Janet (1955) – Slammed into the Yucatán Peninsula as a Category 5 hurricane
 Hurricane Beulah (1967) – Category 5 hurricane that took a similar path.
 Hurricane Emily (2005) – Category 5 hurricane that took a similar path.

Notes

References

External links

 The NHC's archive on Hurricane Dean
 Hurricane Dean came to Chandler, AZ, McQueen & Pecos, view to the South from Chandler Ranch
 
 Images of Hurricane Dean

 
Cape Verde hurricanes
Category 5 Atlantic hurricanes
Natural disasters in the Windward Islands
Hurricanes in the Leeward Islands
Hurricanes in the Windward Islands
Hurricanes in Barbados
Hurricanes in Guadeloupe
Hurricanes in Îles des Saintes
Hurricanes in Dominica
Hurricanes in Martinique
Hurricanes in Saint Lucia
Hurricanes in Puerto Rico
Hurricanes in the Dominican Republic
Hurricanes in Haiti
Hurricanes in Jamaica
Hurricanes in Belize
Atlantic hurricanes in Mexico
Retired Atlantic hurricanes
2007 Atlantic hurricane season
2007 in the Caribbean
Hurricane Dean
Hurricane Dean
Hurricane Dean
Hurricane Dean
Hurricane Dean
August 2007 events in North America
Tropical cyclones in 2007